Jolgeh-ye Chah Hashem District is a district (bakhsh) in Dalgan County, Sistan and Baluchestan province, Iran. At the 2006 census, its population was 22,644, in 4,253 families.  The district has no cities. The district has one rural district (dehestan): Jolgeh-ye Chah Hashem Rural District.

References 

Dalgan County
Districts of Sistan and Baluchestan Province